Cory Littleton (born November 18, 1993) is an American football linebacker for the Carolina Panthers of the National Football League (NFL). He played college football at Washington. He signed with the Los Angeles Rams as an undrafted free agent in 2016.

College career
Littleton attended the University of Washington.

Professional career

Los Angeles Rams

2016 season
Littleton went undrafted in the 2016 NFL Draft. On May 4, 2016, the Los Angeles Rams signed Littleton to a three-year, $1.63 million contract that includes a signing bonus of $15,000 as an undrafted free agent.

Throughout training camp, Littleton competed for a roster spot as a backup outside linebacker against Josh Forrest, Cameron Lynch, Ian Seau, and Matthew Wells. Head coach Jeff Fisher named Littleton a backup outside linebacker to begin the regular season, behind Akeem Ayers and Mark Barron.

Littleton made his NFL debut in the season-opening 28–0 road loss against the San Francisco 49ers. During Week 13, he collected a season-high eight combined tackles during a 26–10 loss at the New England Patriots. The following week, he earned his first NFL start and made one tackle in the Rams' 42–14 loss against the Atlanta Falcons.

Littleton finished his rookie year with 20 combined tackles (15 solo) in 16 games and one start. He was also won the Carroll Rosenbloom Memorial Award as the team's rookie of the year.

2017 season
On January 13, 2017, the Rams announced their decision to hire Washington Redskins' offensive coordinator Sean McVay as their new head coach. Defensive coordinator Wade Phillips installed a base 3-4 defense. During training camp, Littleton competed to be a backup inside linebacker against Josh Forrest and Bryce Hager. Head coach Sean McVay named Littleton a backup inside linebacker to begin the season, behind Mark Barron and  Alec Ogletree.

Littleton ended the season strong. During Week 16, he recorded seven combined tackles, deflected a pass, made his first NFL sack and interception during a 27–23 road victory against the Tennessee Titans. The following week, he collected a season-high eight combined tackles in a 34–13 loss to the San Francisco 49ers.

Littleton finished the season with  36 combined tackles (22 solo), four pass deflections, one sack, and one interception in 16 games and four starts.

The Rams finished the season atop the NFC West with an 11–5 record and qualified for the playoffs. On January 6, 2018, Littleton appeared in his first NFL playoff game and made one tackle during a 26–13 loss to the Atlanta Falcons in the NFC Wildcard Game.

2018 season
Littleton entered training camp slated as a starting inside linebacker after Alec Ogletree was traded to the New York Giants. Head coach Sean McVay named Littleton and Mark Barron the starting inside linebackers to start the regular season, alongside outside linebackers Matt Longacre and Samson Ebukam.

Littleton started in the season-opener against the Oakland Raiders and recorded 13 combined tackles (11 solo), broke up a pass, and made an interception in a 33–13 road victory. Two weeks later against the Los Angeles Chargers, he had 10 combined tackles (5 solo), a pass deflection, and blocked a punt in the end zone that was recovered by Blake Countess for a touchdown in a 35–23 win. During a Week 7 39-10 road victory over the San Francisco 49ers, Littleton again had 10 total tackles (8 solo), including two sacks. He also was credited with the first safety of his pro career after blocking a punt out of the end zone during the second quarter.

Littleton has earned high praise in his first season as a full-time defensive starter for the Rams. Head coach Sean McVay said, “Can't really understate what a great job and what an impact Cory Littleton's made.” Defensive coordinator Wade Phillips also remarked, “I don't know that any linebacker is playing as well as he is in both areas. He's way ahead of everybody in the league as far as pass coverage.”

On December 18, 2018, Littleton was voted to the 2019 Pro Bowl as a special-teams starter. He finished the regular season with a then-career-high 125 tackles, a career-high four sacks, 13 pass deflections, three interceptions, a forced fumble, and an interception returned for a touchdown in 16 games and starts.

In the playoffs, Littleton recorded seven tackles in a 30–22 victory against the Dallas Cowboys and 12 tackles in a 26–23 overtime road victory against the New Orleans Saints in the NFC Championship Game to reach Super Bowl LIII where they lost 13–3 to the New England Patriots. In the Super Bowl, he recorded 10 tackles, two passes defended, and an interception.

2019 season
On March 12, 2019, the Rams placed a second-round restricted free agent tender on Littleton. On May 20, 2019, Littleton signed his tender for one year, $3.095 million.

In the season-opener against the Carolina Panthers, Littleton made 14 tackles and intercepted Cam Newton once in the 30–27 road victory. During 6 against the San Francisco 49ers, he recorded a team high 14 tackles and recovered a fumble forced on Jimmy Garoppolo in the 20–7 loss. In the next game against the Atlanta Falcons, Littleton recorded an interception off Matt Ryan in the 37–10 road victory. During Week 10 against the Pittsburgh Steelers, Littleton recorded a team high 14 tackles and recovered a fumble forced by Nickell Robey-Coleman on wide receiver James Washington in the 17–12 road loss. In the regular-season finale against the Arizona Cardinals, he sacked Kyler Murray once and recovered a fumble lost by Murray during the 31–24 win.

Littleton finished the 2019 season with a career-high 134 tackles, 3.5 sacks, nine pass deflections, two interceptions, two forced fumbles, and four fumble recoveries in 16 games and starts.

Las Vegas Raiders
On March 25, 2020, Littleton signed a three-year, $36 million contract with the Las Vegas Raiders. He was placed on the reserve/COVID-19 list by the team on November 12, 2020, and activated on November 25. He was released on March 15, 2022.

Carolina Panthers
On March 20, 2022, Littleton signed with the Carolina Panthers.

NFL career statistics

Regular season

Postseason

References

External links
 Las Vegas Raiders bio
  Los Angeles Rams bio
 Washington Huskies bio

1993 births
Living people
American football linebackers
People from Spring Valley, San Diego County, California
Sportspeople from San Diego County, California
Players of American football from California
Washington Huskies football players
Los Angeles Rams players
Las Vegas Raiders players
Carolina Panthers players
National Conference Pro Bowl players